Bailey Aviation is a British aircraft manufacturer originally based in Bassingbourn, Royston and later in Over, Cambridgeshire. The company was founded by Paul Bailey and specializes in the design and manufacture of paramotors in the form of ready-to-fly aircraft for the US FAR 103 Ultralight Vehicles rules and the European rules. The company also builds aircraft engines.

History
Paul Bailey started in the car racing business, founding Bailey Motorsport to produce automotive racing components. He earned his private pilot licence and became involved in sky diving and finally paramotoring. He found the paramotoring products available at the time were of sub-standard quality and set out to design and build improved paramotors.

The company has produced a line of innovative paramotors, noted for their modular construction. These include the mid-2000s Bailey JPX D330 and Bailey Solo. The company embarked on the creation of a line of small four-stroke paramotor engines as well, creating the Bailey B200 and the derivative Bailey V5 engine, which powers the Bailey V5 paramotor. The Bailey Hornet two-cylinder two-stroke powered paraglider motor was introduced in 2013.

Aircraft

References

External links

Aircraft manufacturers of the United Kingdom
Aircraft engine manufacturers of the United Kingdom
Ultralight aircraft
Paramotors